Ruin The Memory is an album by British heavy metal band Gutworm, released in 2004.

Track listing 

 What You Are - 3:00
 Loveless - 4:49
 Below Within - 2:42
 Obscure Devotion - 5:52
 Saturate in Sadness - 2:19
 Sick Inside - 5:20
 Blind from Truth - 3:37
 Incineration - 1:54
 Twisted - 4:53
 Reborn - 4:11

Gutworm albums
2004 albums